"Atemlos durch die Nacht" ('German for Breathless Through the Night) is a song by German singer Helene Fischer. It was written by Kristina Bach and produced by Fischer's long-time contributor Jean Frankfurter for her sixth studio album, Farbenspiel (2013). Released on 29 November 2013 as the album's second single, it enjoyed major success in German-speaking Europe, becoming Fischer's biggest hit to date and her first top 10 entry in Austria, Germany, Luxembourg and Switzerland. As of December 2022, it is the fifth most successful song in German history.

It has been covered in English as "Take a Breath" (Kristina Bach), Dutch as "Ademloos door de nacht" (by Loona and Ferry de Lits in the Netherlands) and "Jij en ik" (by Laura Lynn in Belgium) as well as in Afrikaans as "Asemloos" by Liezel Pieters in South Africa. It was also parodied by Austrian punk band Turbobier as "Arbeitslos durch den Tag" (Unemployed Through the Day) in 2015.

The melody was also used as an interval act during the second-semi-final of Melodifestivalen 2016 performed by Swedish singer Charlotte Perrelli as "Här står jag" (Here I Stand), a Swedish-language metasong referring to the decline in success of Schlager music during Melodifestivalen.

Other versions 
In 2018, the DJ Black Noize made a remix of this song in the hardstyle style.

Track listings 

Maxi-single
"Atemlos Durch Die Nacht" (Bassflow Main Radio/Video Mix) – 3:38
"Atemlos Durch Die Nacht" ("The Pope" Remix) – 3:41
"Atemlos Durch Die Nacht" (Bassflow Alternative Remake Edit) – 3:37
"Atemlos Durch Die Nacht" (Album Version) – 3:39
"Atemlos Durch Die Nacht" (A Class Kuduro Floor Mix) – 5:11
"Atemlos Durch Die Nacht" (Florian Paetzold Remix) – 5:02
"Atemlos Durch Die Nacht" (Sean Finn Remix) – 5:30

Remix EP – The Extended Remixes
"Atemlos Durch Die Nacht" (Bassflow Extended Main Remake) 06:31
"Atemlos Durch Die Nacht" (Bassflow Extended Alternative Remake) 06:30
"Atemlos Durch Die Nacht" (Sean Finn Remix) 05:30
"Atemlos Durch Die Nacht" (Florian Paetzold Remix) 05:02
"Atemlos Durch Die Nacht" (A Class Kuduro Floor Mix) 05:11
"Atemlos Durch Die Nacht" (A Class Dance Floor Mix) 04:55
"Atemlos Durch Die Nacht" (A Class Spheric Floor Mix) 05:03

iTunes EP – The Radio Mixes
"Atemlos Durch Die Nacht" (Bassflow Main Radio/Video Mix) – 3:38
"Atemlos Durch Die Nacht" ("The Pope" Remix) – 3:41
"Atemlos Durch Die Nacht" (Bassflow Alternative Remake Edit) – 3:37
"Atemlos Durch Die Nacht" (Sean Finn Remix) – 5:30
"Atemlos Durch Die Nacht" (A Class Kuduro Edit) 03:36
"Atemlos Durch Die Nacht" (A Class Dance Edit) 03:36
"Atemlos Durch Die Nacht" (A Class Spheric Floor Edit) 03:38*
"Atemlos Durch Die Nacht" (Album Version) – 3:39

Credits and personnel 
Michael Bestmann – mastering, mixing
Julian Feifel – background vocals
Jean Frankfurter – keyboards, programming, producer
Franco Leon – background vocals
Birney Oberreit – background vocals
Kareena Schönberger – background vocals
Peter Weihe – guitar

Credits adapted from Farbenspiel album liner notes.

Charts and certifications

Weekly charts

Year-end charts

Decade-end charts

All-time charts

Certifications

See also 
List of number-one hits of 2014 (Austria)

References

External links 

2013 songs
2013 singles
Helene Fischer songs
Schlager songs
German-language songs
Number-one singles in Austria
Songs written by Kristina Bach
Polydor Records singles
Songs containing the I–V-vi-IV progression